Amphisbaena saxosa is a species of worm lizard found in Brazil.

References

saxosa
Reptiles described in 2003
Taxa named by Carolina Castro-Mello
Endemic fauna of Brazil
Reptiles of Brazil